Boshu or Bōshū may refer to:

 Boshu
 Mangzhong, Asian calendar term 
 A kind of Chinese book written on silk (bo)

 Bōshū, another name for Awa Province.

 Bōshū, another name for Suō Province.